A'rouleur' is a type of racing cyclist who excels at long solo efforts and time trials.

Details
A rouleur is a cyclist who is able to maintain a high level of power for a long period of time. He will generally be relatively poor at short, very intense efforts and will be unable to match the accelerations of pure climbers in the mountains, but he will excel on long efforts on relatively flat terrain, such as solo breakaways and time trials.
Examples of rouleurs include Jacques Anquetil, Tony Martin, Tom Dumoulin, Fabian Cancellara, Rohan Dennis, and Filippo Ganna. 

Road bicycle racing terminology